Haltichellinae is a subfamily of chalcidid wasps in the family Chalcididae.

Genera
These genera belong to the subfamily Haltichellinae:

 Allochalcis Kieffer, 1905 c g
 Anachalcis Steffan, 1951 c g
 Antrocephalus Kirby, 1883 c g
 Aphasganophora Nikol'skaya, 1952 c g
 Belaspidia Masi, 1916 c g
 Chirocera Latreille, 1825 c g
 Euchalcis Dufour, 1861 c g
 Haltichella Spinola, 1811 c g b
 Hockeria Walker, 1834 c g b
 Hybothorax Ratzeburg, 1844 c g
 Irichohalticella Cameron, 1912 c g
 Kriechbaumerella Dalla Torre, 1897 c g
 Lasiochalcidia Masi, 1929 c g
 Nearretocera Girault, 1913 c g
 Neochalcis Kirby, 1883 c g
 Neohybothorax Nikolskaja, 1960 c g
 Neostomatoceras Girault, 1920 c g
 Nipponochalcidia Habu, 1976 c g
 Proconura Dodd, 1915 c g
 Psilochalcis Kieffer, 1905 c g b
 Schwarzella Ashmead, 1904 c g b
 Steninvreia Boucek, 1988 c g
 Tanycoryphus Cameron, 1905 c g
 Trichoxenia Kirby, 1883 c g
 Uga Girault, 1930 c g
 Xenarretocera

Girault, 1926 c gData sources: i = ITIS, c = Catalogue of Life, g = GBIF, b = Bugguide.net

References

Further reading

External links

 

Parasitic wasps
Chalcidoidea